Le Grand Cirque (1956) is an oil and gouache on canvas painting by Belarusian-French artist Marc Chagall created in 1956.

Description 
The canvas features acrobats, trapeze artists and clowns. The subject of circus was dear to the artist. Chagall often returned to the circus as a subject matter in his artworks. He considered clowns, acrobats and actors as tragically human beings who are like characters in certain religious paintings. Among other Post-Impressionist and Modern painters who featured the circus in their works are Georges Seurat, Henri de Toulouse-Lautrec, Pablo Picasso, Georges Rouault, Kees van Dongen, and Fernand Léger.

Provenance 
At least until 1974 Le Grand Cirque was in a property of Gustave Stern Foundation, New York. In 2007 the painting was acquired from the Gustave Stern Foundation and Sold at Sotheby’s, New York for $13.8 million, becoming a part of private collection in Switzerland. In 2017, the painting was sold for $16 million, to an Asian telephone bidder.

Exhibitions 

 Bern, Kunsthalle, Marc Chagall, Oeuvres de 1950 à 1956, 1956, no. 46
 Basel, Kunsthalle, Oeuvres des 25 dernières années, 1956, no. 61
 Paris, Galerie Maeght, Marc Chagall, 1957, no. 5
Brussels, Palais des Beaux-Arts & Amsterdam, Stedelijk Museum, L'oeuvre des dernières années, 1956-57, no. 147
Hamburg, Kunstverein im Hamburg; Munich, Haus der Kunst & Paris, Musée des Arts Décoratifs, Marc Chagall, 1959, no. 166, illustrated in the catalogue
Paris, Musée des arts décoratifs, Exposition Marc Chagall, 1959, no. 174
South Bend, Indiana, University of Notre Dame Art Gallery, 1965
Saint-Paul-de-Vence, Fondation Maeght, Hommage à Marc Chagall, 1967, no. 46, illustrated in the catalogue
Zürich, Kunsthaus (on loan)
Jerusalem, The Israel Museum, Chagall in Israel, 2002-03

See also
List of artworks by Marc Chagall

References 

1956 paintings
Paintings by Marc Chagall
Clowns in art